Schiff is a Jewish and German surname meaning "ship". The Schiffs are known from "about 1370, the earliest date to which any contemporary Jewish family can be definitely traced".

It may refer to:

People 
 Adam Schiff (born 1960), American politician, California state Senator and US Representative
 András Schiff (born 1953), Hungarian pianist
 Arthur Schiff (1940–2006), American infomercial copywriter
 Barry Schiff (born 1938), American pilot and journalist
 David Schiff (born 1945), American composer
 Don Schiff (born 1955), American composer and musician
 Dorothy Schiff (1903–1989), American newspaper proprietor
 Frieda Warburg  (1876–1958), American philanthropist
 Gary Schiff (born 1972), American politician   
 Heinrich Schiff (1951–2016), Austrian cellist
 Hugo Schiff (1834–1915), German chemist who discovered Schiff base and Schiff test 
 Irwin Schiff (born 1928), American tax protestor
 Jacob Schiff (1847–1920), German-born American banker
 Jeffrey Schiff, American artist
 John M. Schiff (1904–1987), American banker and leader of the Boy Scouts of America
 Karenna Gore Schiff (born 1973), American author and journalist 
 Leonard I. Schiff (1915–1971), American physicist
 Lonny Schiff (born 1929), American artist
 Moritz Schiff (1823–1896), German biologist
 Mortimer L. Schiff (1877–1931), American banker and leader of the Boy Scouts of America
 Nadine Schiff, Canadian film producer and writer
 Naftali Schiff, British rabbi
 Naomi Schiff (born 1994), Rwandan-Belgian racing driver
 Nathan Schiff (born 1963), American filmmaker
 Otto Schiff (1892–1978), Dutch fencer
 Paul Schiff, American film producer 
 Pearl Schiff (1916–2005), American author   
 Peter Schiff (born 1963), American stock broker, financial analyst, and author 
 Richard Schiff (born 1955), American actor 
 Robert Schiff (1854–1940), Italian chemist
 Robin Schiff, American writer and producer    
 Sol Schiff (1917–2012), American table tennis player
 Stacy Schiff (born 1961), American writer
 Stephen Schiff, American writer    
 Steven Schiff (1947–1998), American politician and US Representative
 Tevele Schiff (died 1791), British rabbi
 Ze'ev Schiff (1932–2007), Israeli journalist

Fictional characters 
 Adam Schiff (Law & Order), a character in the Law & Order franchise
 The Schiff, a species of characters in the anime series Blood+

See also 
 Schiffer
 Schiffmann

References 

German-language surnames
Jewish surnames
Kohenitic surnames
Yiddish-language surnames

ro:Vas